Kiss Kiss Bang Bang is a 2005 American crime/comedy starring Robert Downey, Jr. and Val Kilmer.

Kiss Kiss Bang Bang may also refer to:

Film
 Kiss Kiss (Bang Bang), a 2000 British comedy starring Stellan Skarsgård
 Kiss Kiss...Bang Bang a 1966 Eurospy film with Giuliano Gemma

Music

Songs
 "Mr. Kiss Kiss, Bang Bang", by John Barry on the 1965 soundtrack Thunderball
 "Kiss Kiss Bang Bang", a 1983 song by Specimen
 "Kiss Kiss Bang Bang", by High Contrast from the 2007 album Tough Guys Don't Dance
 "Kiss Kiss Bang Bang", by Nitzer Ebb from the 2010 album Industrial Complex
 "Kiss² Bang²", by Ayaka Komatsu
 "Miss Kiss Kiss Bang", the German entry to the 2009 Eurovision Song Contest
 "Kiss Kiss Bang Bang", by The Subways (2012)

Albums
 Kiss Kiss Bang Bang, a 1986 album by The Celibate Rifles
 Kiss Kiss Bang Bang (EP), a 1997 EP by Glassjaw
 Kiss Kiss Bang Bang, a 2015 album by the Italian rapper Baby K

Books and comics
 Kiss Kiss Bang Bang (comics), a comic book published by CrossGen Entertainment
 Kiss Kiss Bang Bang (book), a 1968 collection of film reviews by Pauline Kael

Television
 "Kiss Kiss Bang Bang" (Dawson's Creek episode)
 "Kiss Kiss, Bang Bang" (Torchwood)

See also
 Thunderball (soundtrack)
 Bang Bang (disambiguation)